Silverwood is an unincorporated community in Fulton Township, Fountain County, Indiana.

History
Silverwood was founded in 1881. The Silverwood post office closed in 1933.

Geography

References

Unincorporated communities in Fountain County, Indiana
Unincorporated communities in Indiana